Brackaghlislea (and ; , and Lios Liath, meaning "grey fort") is a townland lying within the civil parish of Kilcronaghan, County Londonderry, Northern Ireland. It lies to the south-west of the parish and is bounded to the south and west by the civil parish of Ballinascreen. It is bounded by the following townlands: Drumard, Gortahurk, Mormeal, Tamnyaskey and Tullyroan. It was apportioned to the Drapers company and freeholds.

The townland was part of Tobermore electoral ward of the former Magherafelt District Council, however in 1901 and 1926 it was part of Iniscarn district electoral division as part of the Draperstown dispensary (registrar's) district of Magherafelt Rural District. It was also part of the historic barony of Loughinsholin.

History
The modern townland of Brackaghlislea appears to be the amalgamation of two 17th century townlands: Ballynebracky; and Lislea. They are listed separately in several early sources and appear side by side in a map of the Escheated Counties from 1609.

See also
Kilcronaghan
List of townlands in Tobermore
Tobermore

References

Townlands of County Londonderry
Civil parish of Kilcronaghan